Dissé-sous-le-Lude (literally Dissé under Le Lude) is a former commune in the Sarthe department in the Pays de la Loire region in north-western France. On 1 January 2018, it was merged into the commune of Le Lude. Its population was 533 in 2019.

See also
Communes of the Sarthe department

References

Former communes of Sarthe